The 2004 United States presidential election in Minnesota took place on November 2, 2004 as part of the 2004 United States presidential election. Voters chose ten representatives, or electors to the Electoral College, who voted for president and vice president.

Minnesota was won by Democratic nominee John Kerry by a 3.5% margin of victory. Prior to the election, most news organizations considered it as a major swing state in 2004 based on pre-election polling. The state is historically a blue state, as the last Republican to carry the state in a presidential election was Richard Nixon in 1972. However, in 2000 Al Gore carried the state with just 48% of the vote, by a margin of just 2.5%. In 2004, Minnesota was the only state to split its electoral votes, as a faithless elector pledged to Kerry cast a ballot for John Edwards (written as John Ewards), his running mate.

Caucuses
 2004 Republican Party presidential primaries
 2004 Minnesota Democratic presidential caucuses

Campaign

Predictions
There were 12 news organizations who made state-by-state predictions of the election. Here are their last predictions before election day.

 D.C. Political Report: Slight Democrat
 Associated Press: Leans Kerry
 CNN: Kerry
Cook Political Report: Toss-up
 Newsweek: Toss-up
New York Times: Toss-up
 Rasmussen Reports: Toss-up
 Research 2000: Lean Kerry
Washington Post: Battleground
Washington Times: Battleground
Zogby International: Kerry
 Washington Dispatch: Kerry

Polling
Minnesota was considered a swing state based on its tight poll numbers. In early 2004, Kerry was leading in every poll against Bush, sometimes even reaching 50%. However, in the summer, Kerry was still leading in most of the polls but the gap was very small. It wasn't until late October when Bush was leading him. In the last poll by Rasmussen Reports, Kerry won with 48% to 47%, but left a lot of undecided voters. In the last 3 polling average, Kerry lead 49% to 47%, but with Bush winning 2 of 3. The last poll average by Real Clear Politics showed Kerry leading 49% to 45%. Overall polls showed a lot of undecided voters. On election day, Kerry won with 51% of the vote.

Fundraising
Bush raised $2,507,181. Kerry raised $2,635,150.

Advertising and visits
Both tickets visited the state 7 times. A total of $1 million to $3 million was spent each week.

Analysis

Minnesota is the state with the longest streak as a blue state, having last backed the Republican presidential nominee in Richard Nixon's 1972 landslide, and even sticking with the Democrats during Ronald Reagan's two landslides in 1980 and 1984. However, in 2000 and 2004 it was considered a battleground state. Both campaigns invested resources in it, and it ultimately stayed in the Democratic column both times but by relatively narrow margins.

In 2004, the county results were fairly uniform across the state; only a handful of counties had either Bush or Kerry getting over 60% of the vote, and no county had either candidate with over 70% of the vote. Despite winning the state, Kerry won just three of eight congressional districts: Minnesota's 4th congressional district, Minnesota's 5th congressional district, and Minnesota's 8th congressional district.

, this is the last election in which Washington County, Olmsted County, and Dakota County voted for the Republican candidate. This was the first time since 1928 that a Republican had won a majority in Anoka County.

Results

By county

Counties that flipped from Democratic to Republican
 Aitkin (largest municipality: Aitkin)
 Lincoln (largest municipality: Tyler)

Counties that flipped from Republican to Democratic
 Beltrami (largest municipality: Bemidji)
 Blue Earth (largest municipality: Mankato)
 Chippewa (largest municipality: Montevideo)
 Cook (largest municipality: Grand Marais)
 Kittson (Largest city: Hallock)
 Koochiching (Largest city: International Falls)
 Mahnomen (largest municipality: Mahnomen)
 Nicollet (largest municipality: North Mankato)
 Norman (largest municipality: Ada)

By congressional district
Bush won 5 of 8 congressional districts, including one held by a Democrat.

Electors

Technically the voters of Minnesota cast their ballots for electors: representatives to the Electoral College. Minnesota is allocated 10 electors because it has 8 congressional districts and 2 senators. All candidates who appear on the ballot or qualify to receive write-in votes must submit a list of 10 electors, who pledge to vote for their candidate and his or her running mate. Whoever wins the majority of votes in the state is awarded all 10 electoral votes. Their chosen electors then vote for president and vice president. Although electors are pledged to their candidate and running mate, they are not obligated to vote for them. An elector who votes for someone other than his or her candidate is known as a faithless elector.

The electors of each state and the District of Columbia met on December 13, 2004, to cast their votes for president and vice president. The Electoral College itself never meets as one body. Instead the electors from each state and the District of Columbia met in their respective capitols.

The following were the members of the Electoral College from the state. Nine were pledged for Kerry/Edwards, but one made a mistake and ended up voting for Ewards/Edwards and thus became a faithless elector. Minnesota's electors cast secret ballots, so unless one of the electors claims responsibility, it is unlikely that the identity of the faithless elector will ever be known. As a result of this incident, Minnesota Statutes were amended to provide for public balloting of the electors' votes and invalidation of a vote cast for someone other than the candidate to whom the elector is pledged.

 Sonja Berg
 Vi Grooms-Alban
 Matthew Little
 Michael Meuers
 Tim O'Brien
 Lil Ortendahl
 Everett Pettiford
 Jean Schiebel
 Frank Simon
 Chandler Harrison Stevens

See also
 United States presidential elections in Minnesota

Notes

References

Minnesota
2004
Presidential